Teachings of the Prophet Joseph Smith is a book compiling selected sermons and portions of sermons and sundry teachings of Joseph Smith, the first prophet of the Church of Jesus Christ of Latter Day Saints.

The title page reads as follows:

Apostle Joseph Fielding Smith is generally given credit for editing the book, although he had extensive help from fellow researchers.

The book is published by Deseret Book and is a widely used reference work among membership of the Church of Jesus Christ of Latter-day Saints (LDS Church).

In 1993, Deseret Book issued a revised edition of the work edited by Richard C. Galbraith entitled Scriptural Teachings of the Prophet Joseph Smith. This revised work retains the basic text of the work but supplements it with extensive footnoted references to scriptures of the LDS Church.

See also
History of the Church, a seven-volume work that is the source of the selections in Teachings

References
Smith, Joseph (1938), Joseph Fielding Smith (ed.). Teachings of the Prophet Joseph Smith. Salt Lake City: Deseret Book. 
Smith, Joseph (1976), Joseph Fielding Smith (ed.). Teachings of the Prophet Joseph Smith. Salt Lake City: Deseret Book. . 
Smith, Joseph (1993), Joseph Fielding Smith & Richard C. Galbraith (eds.). Scriptural Teachings of the Prophet Joseph Smith. Salt Lake City: Deseret Book. .

External links
 The book published online by the Book of Abraham Project

1938 non-fiction books
1938 in Christianity
Deseret Book books
LDS non-fiction
Works by Joseph Smith